
Świecie County is a unit of territorial administration and local government (powiat) in Kuyavian-Pomeranian Voivodeship, north-central Poland. It came into being on January 1, 1999, as a result of the Polish local government reforms passed in 1998.

As of 2019 its total population is 99,154, out of which the population of Świecie is 25,723, that of Nowe is 5,827, and the rural population is 67,604.

Neighbouring counties
Świecie County is bordered by Starogard County and Tczew County to the north, Kwidzyn County to the north-east, the city of Grudziądz and Grudziądz County to the east, Chełmno County to the south, Bydgoszcz County to the south-west, and Tuchola County to the west.

Administrative division
The county is subdivided into 11 gminas (two urban-rural and nine rural). These are listed in the following table, in descending order of population.

References

 
Land counties of Kuyavian-Pomeranian Voivodeship